David McEwen Eberts (April 22, 1850 – May 20, 1924) was a lawyer and political figure in British Columbia, Canada. He represented Victoria from 1890 to 1894, South Victoria from 1894 to 1903 and Saanich from 1907 to 1916 in the Legislative Assembly of British Columbia as a Conservative.

He was born in Chatham, Ontario, the son of William Duncan Eberts and Mary Bell McEwen, and was educated there and in London, Ontario. Eberts studied law, came to British Columbia in 1878 and was called to the British Columbia bar in 1882. He married Mabel Hope Charles in 1884. In 1892, he was named Queen's Counsel. He served in the Executive Council as Attorney General from 1895 to 1898 and from 1900 to 1903. Eberts was speaker for the assembly from 1907 to 1916. He was defeated when he ran for election to the assembly in 1903 and 1916.

Eberts died in Victoria at the age of 74.

References 

British Columbia Conservative Party MLAs
Speakers of the Legislative Assembly of British Columbia
Attorneys General of British Columbia
1856 births
1924 deaths
Canadian King's Counsel